The Grand Avenue Water Tower is a water tower located at the intersection of Grand Blvd and 20th street in the College Hill neighborhood of St. Louis, Missouri. It is the oldest extant water tower in St. Louis, pre-dating both the Bissell Street Water Tower and the Compton Hill Water Tower.

History
The tower was built in 1871 by architect George I. Barnett in the form of a Corinthian order column with brick, stone and cast iron trim. Inside was a standpipe with a diameter of five feet, designed to hold water. In addition to being used for firefighting, the pressure in the pipe regulated water pressure in the area. In 1912, the water tower was decommissioned, and its standpipe and internal spiral staircase were removed. The staircase was replaced by a vertical ladder, and the tower was modified to include an aircraft warning light. In 1998, the water tower was restored and lit by floodlights.

The tower is the tallest free-standing Corinthian column in the world.

See also
 Architecture of St. Louis
 
 Compton Hill Reservoir Park

Notes

References

St. Louis Commerce Magazine
Up close view from the sky https://www.youtube.com/watch?v=jDz9A9tmmfs

External links
 St. Louis Water Division listing of water towers

Government buildings completed in 1871
Landmarks of St. Louis
Towers completed in 1871
Water towers on the National Register of Historic Places in Missouri
Water towers in Missouri
Corinthian columns
1871 establishments in Missouri
Tourist attractions in St. Louis
Buildings and structures in St. Louis